The Babe Ruth Story is a 1948 biographical film of Babe Ruth, the famed New York Yankees slugger. It stars William Bendix (New York Yankee batboy in the 1920s) as the ballplayer and Claire Trevor as his wife Claire Merritt Hodgson. Critics faulted the film's heavy-handedness and direction, and it is said by many to be one of the worst films ever made.

Plot
The film begins in 1906 at the Baltimore Waterfront, where 11-year-old George Herman Ruth Jr. is taken away by Brother Matthias from George's abusive father to St. Mary's. When George is 18, his incredible baseball talent gets him hired to play for the Baltimore Orioles, and during the interview, he gets his "Babe" nickname.

Babe becomes a successful baseball player and is soon sold off to play for the Boston Red Sox. After a bad game, Babe wonders what went wrong at a bar, until he is told by Claire Hogsdon that when he pitches his curveball he sticks out his tongue. He continues his success, landing a new $100,000 contract. He finds Claire, but she gives him the cold shoulder. During one game, Denny, a sick paralyzed child, and his father watch Babe Ruth play. When Babe says "Hiya, kid" to the boy, the child is miraculously cured and stands up.

Babe soon becomes a player for the New York Yankees. During one game, he accidentally hurts a dog and decides to take the dog and the dog's young owner to the hospital. After Babe argues with the doctors that a dog is the same as a human, the dog is treated, but because Babe left a game to do this, he gets suspended from the Yankees. A depressed Babe Ruth finds himself at a bar, and amidst the crowd giving off negative vibes, he starts a fight and gets arrested.

Soon, he decides to play Santa Claus at a children's hospital, where he runs into Claire again, visiting her nephew. She tells him that his actions affect the children of America, and Babe decides to keep that in mind. Miller Huggins, the same man who suspended Babe, fights to bring him back to the Yankees as the team has had a bad season. Babe is soon brought back, and the team wins the World Series thanks to him. With this, he and Claire get married. Soon after, Huggins dies from pyaemia.

During Game 3 of the 1932 World Series, Babe gets a call from the father of a dying child and promises the father that when he goes up to bat, he will call the third shot and the ball will land at a certain spot; all of this will be for the boy. During the game, Babe does exactly that, and the boy hears the news and starts to get better.

Babe retires from the Yankees at the age of 41, and takes a management position with the Boston Braves, even though they want him to play in the games despite his age. During one game, Babe gets stressed out and can't continue playing, and retires from baseball after that game. Sadly, this means he goes off contract by retiring during his time with the Braves and is fired from anything related to baseball.

Later, Babe complains of neck pain and soon learns that he is dying of throat cancer. The news of this leads fans to send letters telling Babe that they care. The doctors decide to try a treatment on Babe with a chance that he'll survive. As Babe is taken to surgery, the narrator gives words of encouragement to baseball fans, crediting Babe Ruth for America's love of the sport.

Cast
 William Bendix as George Herman Ruth Jr./Babe Ruth
 Robert Ellis as 11 year old George
 Claire Trevor as Claire Hodgson Ruth
 Charles Bickford as Brother Matthias
 William Frawley as Jack Dunn
 Sam Levene as Phil Conrad
 Matt Briggs as Col. Jacob Ruppert
 Fred Lightner as Miller Huggins
 Mark Koenig as himself
 Mel Allen as himself
 H.V. Kaltenborn as himself
 Frankie Darro (uncredited) as Newsboy
 Ralph Dunn (uncredited) as George Ruth Sr.
 Frank Ferguson (uncredited) as Danny's father
 Tommy Ivo (uncredited) as Danny
 Harry Tenbrook (uncredited) as Taxicab driver

Production
Upon learning that the first choice for the lead role, Jack Carson, would not be released from Warner Bros., the producers chose Bendix.

The film was rushed to release after news of Ruth's declining health and makes no mention whatsoever of Ruth's first wife, Helen. The film was released three weeks before Ruth died.

Reception and legacy
Some contemporary reviews were positive, with Bendix drawing accolades from a number of critics for his performance. Variety called the film "interesting, if semi-fictional," writing that it combined "warmth, tears and chuckles into a film that will sustain audience interest," with a performance by Bendix that had "a lot of heart." Harrison's Reports called it "a highly successful picture, from the box-office as well as the entertainment point of view,"  adding that Bendix "handles his part with skill and restraint," and that "few people will come out of the theatre with dry eyes." BoxOffice also ran a positive review, praising the film for its "great warmth and its constant down-to-earth humanness" with "much to appeal to every taste and age," and calling Bendix's portrayal of Ruth "flawless." Shirley Povich of The Washington Post called Bendix "a believable Babe Ruth who, saddled with some of the worst lines and situations ever handed an actor, waded smartly through the mess and gave the screen its best baseball picture ... Hollywood didn't have to take all that license with it, but the nice thing is that the story of Ruth is too powerful for even Hollywood to mess up more than a trifle."

Negative reviews cited the film's moments of heavy-handedness, lack of good baseball action scenes, and dubious portrayal of Ruth as a childlike, kind-hearted oaf. Bosley Crowther of The New York Times wrote that it had "much more the tone of low-grade fiction than it has of biography ... it is hard to accept the presentation of a great, mawkish, noble-spirited buffoon which William Bendix gives in this picture as a reasonable facsimile of the Babe." Crowther also found it "a little incongruous to see a picture about a baseball star containing no more than a minimum of action on a playing field—and most of that studio action which is patently phony and absurd."

John McCarten of The New Yorker also panned the film, calling it "soggy with bathos" and writing that Bendix "handles a bat as if it were as hard to manipulate as a barrel stave. Even with a putty nose, Mr. Bendix resembles Mr. Ruth not at all, and he certainly does the hitter an injustice by representing him as a kind of Neanderthal fellow." Otis Guernsey Jr. of the New York Herald Tribune wrote that the movie "has been sentimentalized out of all possibility of stimulating film biography. It would be hard to find a more colorful American figure than the Babe for motion picture documentation and it would be difficult to do a worse job with him than has been done here."

The Monthly Film Bulletin of Britain wrote: "This film illustrates the American habit of canonizing baseball players, for apparently Babe Ruth did not only perform remarkable feats on the field, but could also perform miracles by curing the sick and the crippled. This power is demonstrated four times in the film, each in an increasingly embarrassing manner, and William Bendix portrays Babe Ruth as a half-witted giant without any redeeming pathos."

More recent assessments have been overwhelmingly negative. The Providence Journal writes that it "turns up on nearly every list of the worst movies ever made, with good reason". In an interview with Dan Shaughnessy of The Boston Globe, Ted Williams called The Babe Ruth Story "the worst movie I ever saw", while The Washington Times stated that the film "stands as possibly the worst movie ever made". The film has been called one of the worst sports films ever by Newsday and The A.V. Club, and called one of the worst biopics by Moviefone and Spike. Michael Sauter included it in his book The Worst Movies of All Time, and Leonard Maltin called it "perfectly dreadful".

See also
The Jackie Robinson Story – 1950 biopic starring Jackie Robinson
Babe Ruth – 1991 biopic starring Stephen Lang
The Babe – 1992 biopic featuring John Goodman
1948 in film

References

External links
 
 
 
 

1948 films
1940s biographical films
1940s sports films
Allied Artists films
American baseball films
American biographical films
American black-and-white films
Biographical films about sportspeople
Cultural depictions of Babe Ruth
1940s English-language films
Films directed by Roy Del Ruth
Sports films based on actual events
Films scored by Edward Ward (composer)
1940s American films